Lim Yong-kyu (born June 18, 1991) is a professional South Korean tennis player. He has won 1 ATP Challenger Tour singles title, the 2010 Busan Open Challenger Tennis. Lim has also won 12 ITF Futures singles titles and 14 ITF doubles titles.

References

External links
 
 
 

South Korean male tennis players
1991 births
Living people
Tennis players at the 2014 Asian Games
Tennis players at the 2018 Asian Games
Asian Games medalists in tennis
Asian Games gold medalists for South Korea
Medalists at the 2014 Asian Games
Universiade medalists in tennis
Universiade gold medalists for South Korea
Universiade bronze medalists for South Korea
Medalists at the 2013 Summer Universiade
People from Andong
21st-century South Korean people